Julius L. Gilbert was a member of the Wisconsin State Assembly.

Biography
Gilbert was born in March 1814. He died on October 20, 1863.

Career
Gilbert was a member of the Assembly during the 1848 session. He was a Democrat.

References

External links

People from Racine County, Wisconsin
Democratic Party members of the Wisconsin State Assembly
1814 births
1863 deaths
Burials in Wisconsin
19th-century American politicians